Novo Selo is a village in the municipalities of Odžak (Federation of Bosnia and Herzegovina) and Vukosavlje (Republika Srpska), Bosnia and Herzegovina.

Demographics 
According to the 2013 census, its population was 1,605, all of them living in the Odžak part, thus none in the Vukosavlje part.

References

Populated places in Odžak
Populated places in Vukosavlje